Lieutenant admiral Henry Pröpper (18 June 1906 – 5 April 1995) was a Dutch military officer who served as Chairman of the United Defence Staff of the Armed Forces of the Netherlands between 1959 and 1962.

Awards and Badges 
  Knight in the Order of the Netherlands Lion 
  Grand Officer in the Order of Orange-Nassau met de zwaarden 
  Bronze Lion 
  War Commemorative Cross with three clasps 
  Officer's Cross with yearmark XXXV 
  Weddingmedal (Beatrix en Claus) 
  Grand Cross in the Order of Leopold II 
  Commander 1st Class in the Order of the Dannebrog 
  Commander Great Cross of the Order of Homayoun 
  Commander of the Legion of Merit 
  Grande-Oficial Order of Naval Merit
  Tamandaré Merit Medal 
  Commander in the Order of the Sword
 Mentioned in Despatches (MID)…

References

External links 
 

1906 births
1995 deaths
Royal Netherlands Navy admirals
Royal Netherlands Navy officers
Chiefs of the Defence Staff (Netherlands)